Savers Health & Beauty (founded in 1988 as Savers Drugstores) is a discount chain of more than five hundred stores, owned by A.S. Watson (Health & Beauty UK) Ltd, which is part of the A.S. Watson Group. It is a value retailer selling a variety of health, beauty, household goods, medicines and fragrances.

History
The company gradually expanded throughout the 1990s, before acquiring the one hundred strong Supersave chain of drugstores from GHEA. The company grew to 176 stores before being sold to A.S. Watson, the retail and manufacturing arm of CK Hutchison Holdings, the conglomerate based in Hong Kong in July 2000.

Subsequently, A.S. Watson acquired Kruidvat BV, the owner of the chain Superdrug in August 2002. Following this, many Savers stores were converted to the format of Superdrug. Some of those Superdrug stores were later re converted back into Savers stores, including a branch at Holywell, Flintshire.

The company is based in Dunstable near Luton; the home office building doubles as one of A.S. Watson large distribution centres in the United Kingdom, serving Savers, Superdrug, and The Perfume Shop. Customer service operations are based at Superdrug's head office in Croydon, London, and the company's registered office is Hutchinson House, Battersea, London.

References

External links
Savers website
A.S. Watson site
 

Retail companies established in 1988
British companies established in 1988
Discount shops of the United Kingdom
British subsidiaries of foreign companies
CK Hutchison Holdings
Companies based in Bedfordshire
2000 mergers and acquisitions